August "Gus" Bodnar (April 24, 1923 – July 1, 2005) was a Canadian professional ice hockey centre who was the Calder Memorial Trophy winner as the National Hockey League's rookie of the year for the 1943-44 season.  He played 12 seasons in the NHL from 1943 to 1955, for the Toronto Maple Leafs, Chicago Black Hawks and Boston Bruins.

Playing career
A native of Fort William, Ontario, Bodnar started his career with the local Fort William Rangers of the Thunder Bay Junior A Hockey League. He played for the Rangers for three seasons from 1941–43 and competed for the Memorial Cup twice in 1941–42 and 1942–43.

After leading the TBJHL in points in 1942–43, Bodnar joined the Toronto Maple Leafs. On October 30, 1943, Bodnar scored his first ever NHL goal 15 seconds in his first NHL game, setting the record for fastest goal by a player in his first NHL game. Bodnar scored 62 points during the regular season, a career best, and he beat Montreal Canadiens rookie goaltender Bill Durnan in voting for the Calder Memorial Trophy in 1943–44. He spent four more seasons with the Maple Leafs and won two Stanley Cups in 1944–45 and 1946–47. Bodnar had 40 assists in his rookie season in 1943–44, which would set a record for assists by a Maple Leafs rookie until surpassed by Mitch Marner in 2016–17.

In 1947–48, Bodnar and fellow linemates Gaye Stewart, Ernie Dickens, Bud Poile and Bob Goldham were traded to the Chicago Black Hawks in exchange for Max Bentley and Cy Thomas. Bodnar remained in Chicago for seven seasons from 1947 to 1954. He also played in the NHL All-Star Game in 1950–51. On March 23, 1952, Bodnar set another NHL record by recording three assists in 21 seconds. With that record, he also helped teammate Bill Mosienko set the record for fastest hat-trick in NHL history In 1953–54, Bodnar was traded to the Boston Bruins midway through the season. He would remain with the Bruins for one more season in 1954–55, before retiring.

Coaching career
Bodnar retired from playing hockey in 1955, but later came back to coach. Bodnar coached in the Boston farm system with the Lakeshore Bruins in the Metro Jr.B league, they won the League Championship in 57/58 and went to the OHA Jr.B Championship round. He was the coach and manager of the Toronto Marlboros from 1967 to 1968. He coached the Marlboros to a Memorial Cup championship in 1966–67. In 1970, Bodnar was named head coach of the Salt Lake Golden Eagles in the WHL. He remained there for one season before signing on as head coach of the Oshawa Generals in the OHA from 1971 to 1976. He was the recipient of the OHA Coach of the Year Award in 1971–72.

Legacy
Bodnar was elected to the Northwestern Ontario Sports Hall of Fame in 1983, and the Oshawa Sports Hall of Fame in 1995. On July 1, 2005, Bodnar died at the Lakeridge Health Unit in Oshawa, Ontario.

Awards and achievements
Calder Memorial Trophy winner in 1944.
Stanley Cup champion in 1945 and 1947.
Played in 1951 NHL All-Star Game.
Memorial Cup champion in 1967 (as head coach).
OHA Coach of the Year award winner in 1972.
Inducted into the Northwestern Ontario Sports Hall of Fame in 1983.
Inducted into the Oshawa Sports Hall of Fame in 1995.

Records
 On October 30, 1943, in his first game, Bodnar scored a goal 15 seconds into the game, setting the record for fastest goal by a player in his first NHL game.
 On March 23, 1952, Bodnar set a NHL record for recording 3 assists in 21 seconds.
 Record rookie assists 1943–44 season (surpassed in 2017 by Mitch Marner with 42 assists)

Career statistics

Transactions
 November 2, 1947 - Traded to the Chicago Black Hawks by the Toronto Maple Leafs with Bud Poile, Gaye Stewart, Ernie Dickens and Bob Goldham for Max Bentley and Cy Thomas.
 February 16, 1954 - Traded to the Boston Bruins by the Chicago Black Hawks for Jerry Toppazzini.

References

External links

Picture of Gus Bodnar's Name on the 1945 Stanley Cup plaque

1923 births
2005 deaths
Boston Bruins players
Calder Trophy winners
Canadian ice hockey centres
Chicago Blackhawks players
Ice hockey people from Ontario
Sportspeople from Thunder Bay
Oshawa Generals coaches
Stanley Cup champions
Toronto Maple Leafs players
Toronto Marlboros coaches
Canadian ice hockey coaches